Ivo Hongn (born 28 May 1991) is an Argentine professional footballer who plays as a forward.

Career
Talleres were Hongn's first club, he began appearing for the club in 2010. He subsequently made nine appearances across three years with Talleres, four coming in his final season of 2012–13; which ended with promotion from Torneo Argentino A. Hongn departed Talleres in 2013 for a three-year spell with Sarmiento, either side of a stint with fellow Torneo Federal B team Sportivo Atenas in 2015. He left Sarmiento in 2016, following thirty-seven games and five goals across two spells. He then signed for Pacífico, though joined Argentine Primera División side Tigre in July 2017. He made his pro debut on 15 September vs. Patronato.

Huracán Las Heras of Torneo Federal A became Hongn's sixth career club in July 2018.

Career statistics
.

Honours
Talleres
Torneo Argentino A: 2012–13

References

External links

1991 births
Living people
Footballers from Córdoba, Argentina
Argentine footballers
Association football forwards
Torneo Argentino A players
Torneo Argentino B players
Argentine Primera División players
Talleres de Córdoba footballers
Sportivo y Biblioteca Atenas de Río Cuarto players
Club Atlético Tigre footballers